The twin villages of Shipton Oliffe and Shipton Solars are situated just  from Cheltenham. The River Coln, just a small stream at this point, flows through the village over two fords and innumerable little water splashes, creating ornamental lakes in private properties. The population of the parish at the 2011 census was 365.

The name Shipton, meaning "sheep farmstead", indicates that sheep farming occurred here long before the Norman invasion. The Domesday Book refers to two manors, Oliffe and Solers, each with its own church. In 1871, they were united as one parish. The former rectory of St Oswald's, Shipton Olife, is a Grade II listed Victorian baronial house, built in 1863 by Thomas Fulljames.

The Gloucestershire Way long-distance footpath passes through the village.

Shipton Oliffe is represented by the county councillor for Northleach division and the district councillor for Sandywell ward on Cotswold District Council.

See also
St Mary's Church, Shipton Solars

References

External links

Villages in Gloucestershire
Cotswold District